Horka II is a municipality and village in Kutná Hora District in the Central Bohemian Region of the Czech Republic. It has about 400 inhabitants.

The Roman numeral in the name serves to distinguish it from the nearby municipality of the same name, Horka I.

Administrative parts
Villages and hamlets of Buda, Čejtice, Hrádek and Onšovec are administrative parts of Horka II.

Geography
The municipality lies on the shore of Švihov Reservoir, which was built on the Želivka River. The Sázava River flows through the municipality.

References

Villages in Kutná Hora District